is a railway station on the Fujikyuko Line in the city of Ōtsuki, Yamanashi, Japan, operated by Fuji Kyuko (Fujikyu).

Lines

Station layout
The station is unstaffed, and consists of a single side platform serving a single bidirectional track. The station structure consists of a simple waiting room with no other facilities.

Adjacent stations

History
It was renamed Kamiōtsuki in 1934.

Passenger statistics
In fiscal 1998, the station was used by an average of 74 passengers daily.

Surrounding area
 Tsuru High School
 Ōtsuki Municipal Hospital

See also
 List of railway stations in Japan

References

External links

 Fujikyuko station information 

Railway stations in Yamanashi Prefecture
Railway stations in Japan opened in 1929
Stations of Fuji Kyuko
Ōtsuki, Yamanashi